James Earl Wright (March 27, 1939 – February 26, 2009) was an American professional football player who was a  defensive back and quarterback in the American Football League (AFL) and the Canadian Football League (CFL). He played college football for the Memphis Tigers.

Early life and high school
Wright was born and grew up in Columbus, Mississippi. He attended Stephen D. Lee High School, where he lettered in baseball, football and track.

College career
Wright attended Memphis State University and was the Tigers' starting quarterback for three seasons. As a senior, Time referred to Wright as "the most dangerous back in the South". Wright was leading the nation in total offense as a senior before suffering torn cartilage in his left knee against Southern Mississippi. He finished the season with 604 yards and 11 passing touchdowns. Wright was inducted into the Memphis Athletic Hall of Fame in 1979.

Professional career
Wright was selected by the Philadelphia Eagles in the third round of the 1961 NFL Draft and by the Boston Patriots in the 14th round of the 1961 AFL Draft. He did not sign with either team and was later signed by the Edmonton Eskimos. Wright missed the entire 1962 season due to his knee injury. In 1963 he played in three games, completing 5 of 15 passes for 89 yards with one touchdown pass and four interceptions and rushed ten times for 33 yards. Wright's season ended when he tore ligaments in his right knee. Wright was signed by the Denver Broncos in 1964 and was moved to defensive back. He played in ten games in 1964.

References

External links
Memphis Tiger Hall of Fame bio
Tennessee Sports Hall of Fame bio

1939 births
2009 deaths
American football quarterbacks
Memphis Tigers football players
Players of American football from Mississippi
Denver Broncos players
Edmonton Elks players
American football defensive backs
Canadian football quarterbacks